Bridgette Marie Jordan (June 9, 1989 – June 12, 2019) was the smallest living woman according to Guinness World Records at 2 ft 3in (69 cm). She was also one of the shortest living siblings according to Guinness World Records with her younger brother Brad was 38 inches tall at 20 years old (in 2011). The siblings were born with a rare genetic condition called Microcephalic osteodysplastic primordial dwarfism type II. Bridgette Jordan was the smallest woman in the USA. She lived in Sandoval, Illinois, having attended college at Kaskaskia College. She enjoyed dancing and cheerleading. She was on the cheer squad for Kaskaskia. She wore an infant size 2 shoe.

Jordan received the record from the previous Guinness record holder, Elif Kocaman of Kadirli, Turkey, who measured 2 feet, 4.5 inches on September 20, 2011, but then lost the record to Jyoti Amge of Nagpur, India, on December 16, 2011, when Amge turned 18.

Jordan was born weighing in at 1 pound, 12 ounces and was 12.5 inches long. Her brother Brad was born weighing 2 pounds, 4 ounces, and measured 13.5 inches long. Together, the two only reached 5 ft 5in. Brad Jordan died on February 21, 2017, at the age of 25. Bridgette Jordan died on June 12, 2019.

See also
 List of shortest people
 Shortest women
 Primordial dwarfism
 Dwarfism

References

External links
 metro.co.uk Associated Newspapers Limited, Worlds Shortest Woman, Retrieved on 2011-10-22.
 huffingtonpost.com Huffington Post By David Moye, Guinness Declares Illinois Resident Bridgette Jordan The World's Shortest Woman.
 worldrecordsacademy.org World Records Academy, Shortest woman: Bridgette Jordan breaks Guinness world record, Friday, October 14, 2011.
youtube.com You Tune, Bridgette Jordan - The world's shortest living woman, Guinness world record.
guinnessworldrecords.com Guinness World Records Video: Bridgette Jordan is new world's shortest living woman.
facebook.com Brad and Bridgette Face Book page.
abcnews.go.com Who Is the World's Shortest Woman?, By Katie Kindelan, Sep 21, 2011
youtube.com YouTube,  The Shortest Siblings - Guinness World Record 2012.
yubanet.com Yuba Net, Nevada City, California, Guinness World Record: New Shortest Living Woman, Sep 20, 2011
nodeju.com NDJ World, An American Is Smallest Woman In The World, Sep 20 2011
 worldssmallestpeople.com About Brad and Bridgette.
vimeo.com Vimeo, LLC, Bridgette & Brad Jordan, the World's Smallest Siblings; World's Smallest Lady - EPISODE 1 by Gary Parker/Photographer

1989 births
2019 deaths
People from Marion County, Illinois
Place of birth missing
Place of death missing
People with dwarfism